Leanne Harte is an Irish singer-songwriter. Harte rose to prominence after an appearance on Irish radio RTÉ 2 at age sixteen. She was nominated as the "Hope for 2008" artist at the 2008 Meteor Music Awards.

Private life
Harte volunteers some of her private time doing charity work. She is additionally currently exploring other multimedia projects.

In June 2010, Harte came out as gay.

Discography
 2003: Eradicaton (True Talent Records)
 2006: Leanne Harte (True Talent Records)
 2007: An Irish Girl In Paris (True Talent Records)
 2013: Restless sleepers (Leanne Harte/IMRO):
 All songs written by Leanne Harte
 Produced by Ray Traynor & Gary Reddy
 Recorded and Mixed by Ray Traynor at Loudroom, Dublin
 Mastered by Gary Scully at Acquaries Mastering, Berlin

References

External links
 Official website

Year of birth missing (living people)
Living people
20th-century Irish women singers
Irish women singer-songwriters
Lesbian singers
Lesbian songwriters
Irish lesbian musicians
Irish LGBT singers
Irish LGBT songwriters
21st-century Irish women singers
20th-century LGBT people
21st-century LGBT people